is a Japanese male former weightlifter, who competed in the 67.5 category and represented Japan at international competitions. He won the bronze medal in the snatch at the 1970 World Weightlifting Championships lifting 125.0 kg. He participated at the 1972 Summer Olympics and at the 1976 Summer Olympics.

References

External links
 

1947 births
Living people
Japanese male weightlifters
World Weightlifting Championships medalists
Place of birth missing (living people)
Olympic weightlifters of Japan
Weightlifters at the 1972 Summer Olympics
Weightlifters at the 1976 Summer Olympics
20th-century Japanese people
21st-century Japanese people